Jalo is a Finnish given name and surname.


Given name

Jalo Heikkinen, writer
Jalo Kalima, linguist, translator and professor
Jalo Kilpinen, pole vaulter
Jalo Syvähuoko, construction businessman

Surname
Marvi Jalo, writer
Merja Jalo, writer
Olli Jalo, photographer
Risto Jalo, ice hockey player
Toni Jalo, ice hockey player

References

See also 
 

Finnish masculine given names
Finnish-language surnames